Ragıp Eşref Filiz (born 1 June 1978) is a Turkish author and journalist. He is well known for his famous political fiction novel Raul Mendez Must Die (2013) and his award-winning short story book The Horror Stories From The Anatolia (National Tudem Literary Award 2014).

Ragıp Eşref Filiz was born as the youngest son of  his teacher parents Mehmet and Gülbiye Filiz in 1978. He studied  International Relations at the Black Sea Technical University.He studied English teaching at California Uni-Prep Institute and completed his master's degree in International Relations at Istanbul Medeniyet University. He worked as a flight attendant for a long time before his writing career and he used this job as an opportunity to travel all around the world and make observations about different geographies and cultures which he would use in his books afterwards. He also worked as a chief editor for a popular internet newspaper sanalgaste.com.tr in Turkey from 2015 to 2018. He's a polyglot and it is known that he speaks Turkish, English and Spanish.

References

Living people
1978 births
Turkish writers
Turkish journalists